The Garth Brooks World Tour may refer to three different concert tours by American country pop musician Garth Brooks:

The Garth Brooks World Tour (1993–94)
The Garth Brooks World Tour (1996–98)
The Garth Brooks World Tour (2014–17)